Frogwell is a hamlet in the parish of Callington, Cornwall, England. It is in the valley of the River Lynher.

References

Hamlets in Cornwall
Callington